María Fernanda Agustina Sainz Rubio (born 26 February 1945) better known as Tina Sainz is a Spanish actress. She has appeared in such films as Sangre de Mayo and Story of a Kiss. Her television credits include Recuerda cuándo, Compañeros and Estudio 1. In 2017, she appeared in the Netflix series Cable Girls.

References

External links

Living people
Actresses from Madrid
1945 births
20th-century Spanish actresses
21st-century Spanish actresses
Spanish film actresses
Spanish television actresses